Stanwell Park railway station is located on the South Coast railway line in New South Wales, Australia. It serves the seaside village of Stanwell Park opening on 23 December 1901, relocating to its current location on 10 October 1920.

Buildings and railway history
The original rail line followed what is now Lawrence Hargrave Drive, curving around the southern headland and through Stanwell Park. The station opened on 14 March 1890 at its original site opposite Station Street under the footbridge. To the north the line followed Chellow Dene Avenue to the Otford Tunnel through Bald Hill.

A platform was provided on the eastern side on 24 April 1890, and was moved to the western side to make room for a crossing loop which opened on 23 December 1901. Station buildings were added on 4 June 1903 and a signal box on 17 May 1909. A second platform was provided on 13 July 1909, and the footbridge over the station installed on 9 October 1911.

To the north a steep grade of 1 in 40 faced northbound trains almost all the way to Otford. Refuge sidings were provided for northbound trains at Stanwell Park from 17 December 1912 so that the rear portion of divided trains no longer had to be left on the main line.

In 1920, the original single line was replaced with a double track deviation. The deviation avoided the Otford Tunnel and steep grades by tracing around the Stanwell Park amphitheatre at a higher level, and the present station was constructed.

Platforms & services
Stanwell Park has two side platforms and is serviced by NSW TrainLink South Coast line services travelling between Waterfall and Port Kembla. Some peak hour and late night services operate to Sydney Central, Bondi Junction and Kiama.

Transport links
Premier Charters operates two routes to and from Stanwell Park station:
2: to Wollongong via Thirroul
15: to Helensburgh station

References

External links

Stanwell Park station details Transport for New South Wales

Buildings and structures in Wollongong
Railway stations in Australia opened in 1890
Railway stations in Australia opened in 1920
Regional railway stations in New South Wales